Christmas Island is an album by the musician Leon Redbone. It was released in 1988, with a rerelease the following year.

The title track has been mentioned in many works of fiction.

Production
The album was recorded in three days. Redbone picked songs that he thought would appeal to listeners who didn't usually enjoy Christmas music. He duetted with Dr. John on "Frosty the Snowman". "Winter Wonderland" contains a dobro solo. "Christmas Ball Blues" is a version of the song made popular by Bessie Smith.

Critical reception

Robert Christgau wrote: "Beyond sacred schlock-by-association and rock and roll gifts, Christmas is a pop holiday that plays best in the background, which suits Redbone's forgettable old-timey lassitude." The Philadelphia Inquirer concluded that, "with a deep, wavery delivery, the growl-voiced blues-folkie comes across as a kind of Crosby on Quaaludes." The St. Petersburg Times stated that Redbone's "trademark laconic style puts an entirely new spin on these tunes."

The Washington Post determined that "after a while the effortless renditions start sounding too similar." The Los Angeles Times deemed the album "sultry, desert-island swing." The Orlando Sentinel noted the "bittersweet" atmosphere, writing that the songs are "exceptional, true-to-the-original versions." The Toronto Sun opined that Redbone's "cornball style is tailor-made for traditional hokum."

AllMusic praised Redbone's "joyous performance."

Track listing

References

Leon Redbone albums
1988 albums
Private Music albums
1988 Christmas albums